The District of Columbia Protective Services Division (formerly, the Protective Services Police Department) is a division of the Department of General Services of the District of Columbia Government. The organization is responsible for "law enforcement activities and physical security of all properties owned, leased or otherwise under the control of the Government of the District of Columbia."

PSD officers are sworn law enforcement personnel with full police authority delegated from the Mayor of the District of Columbia and have the authority to bear firearms, serve warrants, and make full custodial arrests throughout the District of Columbia

History
The PSD traces its beginnings to an 1899 Act of Congress, the "Watchmen in Municipal Facilities Act", which ordered the creation of a police force separate from the Metropolitan Police Department to maintain law and order in municipal government facilities that at the time were controlled by the federal government.

In 1973, the District of Columbia government established the Government Protective Services Division to control the police force being transferred from the federal government to the Mayor of the District of Columbia under the Home Rule Act. D.C. Code § 10-1005 establishes the "Protective Services Police Department, which shall coordinate and manage the security and law enforcement requirements for District government agencies and facilities."

In September 2009, Mayor Adrian Fenty signed an Executive Order that changed the name of the agency from "Protective Services Division" to "Protective Services Police Department."

In 2012, Mayor Vincent Gray transferred PSPD from the Department of Real Estate Services to the new Department of General Services. The legislation ordering the transfer was attached to the FY 2012 Budget Support Act, and transmitted to the U.S. Congress on August 11, 2012, for a 30-day review. Congress took no action, thus it became law on October 1, 2012. With this act, the Protective Services Police Department became the Protective Services Division of the Department of General Services.

Areas of responsibility and primary jurisdiction
John A. Wilson Building (Seat of Government)
Historic Eastern Market
DC Government Office Buildings (Reeves Center, One Judiciary Square, Municipal Center, Southwest Towers, etc.)
DC Department of Mental Health facilities, including St Elizabeth's Hospital and Halfway Houses throughout the city
DC City Parks, Recreation Centers and Pools
DC Office on Aging Facilities including 2 Nursing Homes
DC Fire and EMS Headquarters, Fire Stations and facilities
DC Department of Human Services Homeless Shelters
DC Department of Human Services Welfare Offices 
DC Department of Health Community Health Care Clinics (Unity Health)
DC Animal Shelter and associated facilities
DC Water treatment plants and facilities
DC Department of Public Works yards and facilities
DC Department of Transportation yards and facilities
DC Department of Homeland Security and Emergency Management Agency Headquarters
DC Metropolitan Police Department Headquarters and facilities
DC Office of Unified Communications facilities (911 centers, communications towers, etc.)
DC Court Services and Offender Supervision Agency (Parole and Probation)
DC Department of Motor Vehicles Service Centers
DC Village Campus
DC General Campus
ST Elizabeth's Campus
DC Sports and Entertainment Authority facilities (RFK Stadium, Nationals Stadium, etc.)
DC Department of Employment Services One Stop Centers and facilities
DC OCTO Data Centers
DC Child and Family Services Agency facilities

Operational 
PSD officers assigned to the Mobile Operations Branch are deployed throughout the District of Columbia and are responsible for answering calls for police services in the assigned Police District. PSD utilizes the District of Columbia Office of Unified Communications for dispatching and therefore, PSD officers work off the same radio dispatch zones as their DC Metropolitan Police Department and DC Housing Authority counterparts.

PSD is tasked with providing uniformed police officers to support the operations of other District agencies when needed and is occasionally tasked with providing Executive Protection Details to District Government Officials or other dignitaries visiting the District of Columbia.

PSD officers are issued similar duty equipment as the officers of the MPDC. The standard duty weapon is the GLOCK 17, while officials at the rank of Captain and above may be issued GLOCK 19 or GLOCK 26 service weapons. Since, PSD officers are government employees with the authority to make full custodial arrests; the officers are "qualified law enforcement officers" as defined in the Law Enforcement Officers Safety Act, and can therefore carry concealed firearms while off-duty anywhere in the United States without regard to local and state laws.

Organization

  Uniformed Operations Section - Uniformed police patrols covering all seven police districts, 911 response and protection of critical infrastructure, government officials and the public using DC Government Facilities, as well as uniformed police details at the Wilson Building (Seat of Government), DC Consolidated Forensics Laboratory and the DC National Guard Armory. 
  Threat Management Section - Threat management, threat assessments on District Government Officials, electronic security systems, coordinating and writing emergency response plans for District agencies including the Emergency Evacuation/Relocation Plan for the District Government.
 Mission Support Section - Administrative Operations and Contract Security Guard Management

Leaders

Rank structure
PSD uses a rank structure that is similar to MPDC.

Fallen officers
Since 1973, one PSD/PSPD officer has died in the line of duty. Mack Wesley Cantrell died from gunshot wounds sustained during the Hanafi Siege of the District Building (now the John Wilson Building) on March 9, 1977.

Gallery

See also

List of law enforcement agencies in the District of Columbia

References

External links
 District of Columbia Protective Services Division (PSD) official page

Law enforcement agencies of the District of Columbia
Continuity of government in the United States